From the Cradle is the twelfth solo studio album by Eric Clapton released on 13 September 1994 by Warner Bros. Records. A blues cover album and Clapton's follow-up to his successful 1992 live album, Unplugged, it is his only UK number-one album to date.

Although he had long been associated with the blues, From the Cradle was Clapton's first attempt at an all-blues album. He would subsequently record Riding with the King with B.B. King; a tribute to Robert Johnson, Me and Mr. Johnson; and a collaboration with J. J. Cale, The Road to Escondido.

Critical reception 

From the Cradle has prompted a wide range of critical response. The title actually comes from the last line of a four-line poem written by Clapton in his own handwriting (which he never set to music), printed on the second page of the CD booklet: "All along this path I tread / My heart betrays my weary head / with nothing but my love to save / from the cradle to the grave." Stephen Thomas Erlewine of Allmusic feels that the album is almost perfect and that the only thing bad about the album is Clapton's singing, which merely imitates the original recordings and sometimes can't pull it off. Tom Sinclair of Entertainment Weekly felt that the recordings were "flawless" but were rather boring, especially when compared to the excitement of Cream's live version of "Spoonful". The Music Box's John Metzger felt that Clapton's appearance on Saturday Night Live to promote the album was more powerful than From the Cradle and that the album had nothing that hadn't been done before on it. Robert Christgau compared Eric Clapton's work on the album to Son Seals and Otis Rush, saying that Clapton played better than the former, but sang worse than the latter and felt that "Motherless Child" and "Blues Before Sunrise" were stand-out tracks on the album.

According to the liner notes, the album was recorded live in the studio with few overdubs or edits, the only overdubs being featured on "Hoochie Coochie Man" (guitar) and "Motherless Child" (percussion, likely handclaps).

The album won Clapton the 1995 Grammy Award for Best Traditional Blues Album and he received a further nomination for Album of the Year.

In July 2014, Guitar World placed From the Cradle on their list "Superunknown: 50 Iconic Albums That Defined 1994".

Track listing 
 "Blues Before Sunrise" (Leroy Carr) – 2:58; this version is inspired also by Elmore James's rendition of the song
 "Third Degree" (Eddie Boyd, Willie Dixon) – 5:07
 "Reconsider Baby" (Lowell Fulson) – 3:20
 "Hoochie Coochie Man" (Dixon) – 3:16; originally performed by Muddy Waters
 "Five Long Years" (Boyd) – 4:47
 "I'm Tore Down" (Sonny Thompson) – 3:02; originally performed by Freddie King
 "How Long Blues" (Carr) – 3:09
 "Goin' Away Baby" (Jay A. Lane) – 4:00
 "Blues Leave Me Alone" (Lane) – 3:36
 "Sinner's Prayer" (Lloyd Glenn, Fulson) – 3:20
 "Motherless Child" (Robert Hicks) – 2:57
 "It Hurts Me Too" (Tampa Red) – 3:17
 "Someday After a While" (Freddy King, Thompson) – 4:27
 "Standin' Round Crying" (McKinley Morganfield) – 3:39
 "Driftin'" (Charles Brown, Johnny Moore, Eddie Williams) (Johnny Moore's Three Blazers) – 3:10
 "Groaning the Blues" (Dixon) – 6:05; originally performed by Otis Rush

Personnel 
 Eric Clapton – guitars, vocals
 Andy Fairweather Low – guitars
 Chris Stainton – keyboards
 Dave Bronze – bass
 Jim Keltner – drums
 Richie Hayward – percussion on "How Long Blues"
 Jerry Portnoy – harmonica
 The Kick Horns – horn arrangements 
 Simon Clarke – baritone saxophone
 Tim Sanders – tenor saxophone
 Roddy Lorimer – trumpet

Production 
 Producers – Eric Clapton and Russ Titelman
 Engineers – Alan Douglas (Tracks 1-6 & 8-16); Alex Haas (Track 7).
 Assistant Engineers – Giles Cowley and Julie Gardiner 
 Mixing – Alan Douglas and Russ Titelman
 Mastered by Ted Jensen at Sterling Sound (New York, NY).
 Guitar Technician – Lee Dickson
 Equipment Technician – Ravi Sharman
 Project Coordinator – Mick Double
 Design – Wherefore Art?
 Cover Photography – Eric Clapton 
 Photography – Jack English

Chart performance

Weekly charts

Year-end charts

Certifications

References 

Eric Clapton albums
1994 albums
Albums produced by Russ Titelman
Warner Records albums
Reprise Records albums
Grammy Award for Best Traditional Blues Album
Albums recorded at Olympic Sound Studios